The Weeks–McLean Act was a law of the United States sponsored by Representative John W. Weeks (R) of Massachusetts and Senator George P. McLean (R) of Connecticut that prohibited the spring hunting and marketing of migratory birds and the importation of wild bird feathers for women's fashion, ending what was called "millinery murder". It gave the Secretary of Agriculture the power to set hunting seasons nationwide, making it the first U.S. law ever passed to regulate the shooting of migratory birds.  It became effective on 4 March 1913 but, because of a constitutional weakness, was later replaced by the Migratory Bird Treaty Act of 1918.

Henry Ford supported the legislation, "The only time I ever used the Ford organization to influence legislation was on behalf of the birds, and I think the end justified the means."

See also
 Missouri v. Holland
 Lacey Act of 1900

References

1913 in the environment
1913 in law
62nd United States Congress
Bird conservation
United States federal environmental legislation
United States federal legislation articles without infoboxes
United States environmental case law
Bird hunting
Wildlife law